The SV Mandalay is a three-masted schooner measuring  pp, with a wrought iron hull. It was built as the private yacht Hussar (IV), and would later become the research vessel Vema, one of the world's most productive oceanographic research vessels. The ship currently sails as the cruising yacht Mandalay in the Caribbean.

E.F. Hutton's luxury yacht, Hussar IV 

Hussar (IV) was designed by Cox & Stevens and built in 1923 by Burmeister & Wain in Copenhagen for E. F. Hutton and his wife Marjorie Merriweather Post.  The 585-ton luxury yacht had an iron-hull and represented the epitome of maritime luxury and glamour in her class. Interiors were designed by William Baumgarten & Co of New York, the first American firm to do the interior decoration of a ship abroad. Upon her completion in Denmark  King Christian X was invited to inspect the ship prior to its maiden crossing to New York. It was one of the fastest yachts, breaking the transatlantic record in 10 days, 21 hours. The yacht was affiliated with the New York Yacht Club, and spent the winters in the Florida Keys with frequent guests such as actress Billie Burke and Broadway impresario Florenz Ziegfeld, a fellow New Yorker whom Hutton liked to deep sea fish with.

Norwegian yacht, Vema 
In the late 1920s the Hutton's decided they wanted a larger yacht, so they commissioned the construction of the  Hussar (V) (later Sea Cloud). The Hussar IV was put up for sale in September 1930, and eventually sold to Norwegian shipping magnate, G. Unger Vetlesen and his wife Maude Monell and renamed Vema, a combination of Vetlesen and Maude.

U.S. WWII Service 

During World War II, Maude Monell donated Vema to the American war effort.  The vessel was put into service as a barracks and training ship for United States Merchant Marine cadets, deployed patrolling coastal waters for the US Coast Guard.  Assigned to the US Maritime Service Training Station on Hoffman Island, her sailing area was listed as 14,000 sqf. After the war she was abandoned off Staten Island until Louis Kenedy, a captain from Nova Scotia, salvaged the vessel. LDEO leased the vessel in 1953 and soon bought her for $100,000.

Research Vessel Vema 

Vema started circling the globe as the first of the Lamont Geological Observatory research vessels (now the Lamont–Doherty Earth Observatory [LDEO]), a research unit of Columbia University.. Displaying a black hull, she was used to collect samples of seawater and sediment cores, measure currents and heat flows, perform underwater photography and seismic studies, and map out ocean floors. The work on the ship helped to confirm the continental drift theory.

Seafloor features
 The Vema was instrumental in the exploration of the Mid-Atlantic Ridge. G.R. Hamilton aboard RV Vema discovered this feature in 1956.
 Vema Trench in the Indian Ocean is in fact a fracture zone named trench to avoid confusion with the Vema Fracture Zone in the Atlantic Ocean mentioned above. RV Vema discovered it in 1958.
Discovered during one of Vema's journeys, it has a depth of 4,646 m and a width of 18 km, serving as a conduit for the Antarctic Bottom Water and Weddell Sea bottom water.

Other research vessels of the LDEO 

, 1962–1989
, 1962–1974
, 1988–2005
, 2004-

Cruising yacht Mandalay

The ship was refitted again as a cruising yacht for the Caribbean under the name SV Mandalay (also Mandalay of Tortola) with a sail area of > . The ship was operated by Windjammer Barefoot Cruises from 1982 until the operator went out of business in 2008.
Mandalay subsequently was  purchased at auction, refurbished, and used as specialty cruise ship in the Galapagos islands off Ecuador by Angermeyer Cruises.  

Most recently, the S/V Mandalay later sailed weekly out of Grenada for one and two-week cruises in the Grenadines for Sail Windjammer, Inc. However, Sail Windjammer announced in early 2021 that the company would be ceasing operations due to the financial impact of the COVID-19 pandemic and damage to the SV Mandalay.

References

External links 

Voyages of the R/V Vema
RV Vema's science tracks of 1,225,000 nautical miles
S/V Mandalay
Sail Windjammer S/V Mandalay

Schooners
Ships built in Copenhagen
Research vessels of the United States
University-National Oceanographic Laboratory System research vessels
1923 ships
Cruise ships
Columbia University
New York Yacht Club
Yachts of New York Yacht Club members
Ships of the United States Coast Guard